The Darling Downs District Rugby Union, or DDRU, is the governing body for the sport of rugby union within the District of  Darling Downs, Queensland in Australia. It is a member of the Queensland Country Rugby Union.

History

Clubs
The clubs that compete in the senior grade competition are:
 Condamine Rugby Union
 Dalby Wheatmen Rugby Union Football Club
 Goondiwindi Rugby
 Highfields Redbacks Rugby Union
 Roma Rugby Union
 South Burnett Rugby
 St George & District Rugby
 Toowoomba Bears Rugby
 Toowoomba Rangers Rugby
 University Of Southern Queensland Rugby Club
 Warwick & Districts Rugby

See also

Rugby union in Queensland

References

External links
 
 

Rugby union governing bodies in Queensland
Darling Downs